Chloride intracellular channel protein 3 is a protein that in humans is encoded by the CLIC3 gene. This protein is a chloride channel.

See also
 Chloride channel

References

Further reading

External links
 
 
 

Ion channels